Park Yong-sung (born September 11, 1940) is a South Korean businessman and Chairman of Doosan Heavy Industries & Construction. He is  the former chairman of the Korea Chamber of Commerce and Industry.

References

South Korean businesspeople
Living people
New York University Stern School of Business alumni
1940 births